This is a list of the most massive stars that have been discovered, in solar masses .

Uncertainties and caveats
Most of the masses listed below are contested and, being the subject of current research, remain under review and subject to constant revision of their masses and other characteristics. Indeed, many of the masses listed in the table below are inferred from theory, using difficult measurements of the stars' temperatures and absolute brightnesses. All the masses listed below are uncertain: Both the theory and the measurements are pushing the limits of current knowledge and technology. Both theories and measurements could be incorrect.

Complications with distance and obscuring clouds
Since massive stars are rare, astronomers must look very far from Earth to find them. All the listed stars are many thousands of light years away, which makes measurements difficult. In addition to being far away, many stars of such extreme mass are surrounded by clouds of outflowing gas created by extremely powerful stellar winds; the surrounding gas interferes with the already difficult-to-obtain measurements of stellar temperatures and brightnesses, which greatly complicates the issue of estimating internal chemical compositions and structures. This obstruction leads to difficulties in calculating parameters.

Both the obscuring clouds and the great distances make it difficult to judge whether the star is just a single supermassive object or, instead, a multiple star system. A number of the “stars” listed below may actually be two or more companions orbiting too closely to distinguish by our telescopes, each star being massive in itself but not necessarily “supermassive” to either be on this list, or near the top of it.
Other combinations are possible – for example a supermassive star with one or more smaller companions or more than one giant star – but without being able to see inside the surrounding cloud, it is difficult to know the truth of the matter.

More globally, statistics on stellar populations seem to indicate that the upper mass limit is in the 100–200 solar mass range, so all mass estimates exceeding this range are suspect.

Rare reliable estimates
Eclipsing binary stars are the only stars whose masses are estimated with some confidence. However note that almost all of the masses listed in the table below were inferred by indirect methods; only a few of the masses in the table were determined using eclipsing systems.

Amongst the most reliable listed masses are those for the eclipsing binaries NGC 3603-A1, WR 21a, and WR 20a. Masses for all three were obtained from orbital measurements. This involves measuring their radial velocities and also their light curves. The radial velocities only yield minimum values for the masses, depending on inclination, but light curves of eclipsing binaries provide the missing information: inclination of the orbit to our line of sight.

Relevance of stellar evolution
Some stars may once have been more massive than they are today. It is likely that many large stars have suffered significant mass loss (perhaps as much as several tens of solar masses). This mass may have been expelled by superwinds: high velocity winds that are driven by the hot photosphere into interstellar space. The process forms an enlarged extended envelope around the star that interacts with the nearby interstellar medium and infusing the region with elements heavier than hydrogen or helium.

There are also – or rather were – stars that might have appeared on the list but no longer exist as stars, or are supernova impostors; today we see only their debris. The masses of the precursor stars that fueled these destructive events can be estimated from the type of explosion and the energy released, but those masses are not listed here (see § Black holes below).

Mass limits
There are two related theoretical limits on how massive a star can possibly be: the accretion limit and the Eddington mass limit. The accretion limit is related to star formation: After about 120  have accreted in a protostar, the combined mass should have become hot enough for its heat to drive away any further incoming matter. In effect, the protostar reaches a point where it evaporates away material as fast as it collects new material.
The Eddington limit is based on light pressure from the core of an already-formed star: As mass increases past ~150 , the intensity of light radiated from a Population I star's core will become sufficient for the light-pressure pushing outward to exceed the gravitational force pulling inward, and the surface material of the star will be free to float away into space.

Accretion limits
Astronomers have long hypothesized that as a protostar grows to a size beyond 120 , something drastic must happen. Although the limit can be stretched for very early Population III stars, and although the exact value is uncertain, if any stars still exist above 150–200  they would challenge current theories of stellar evolution.

Studying the Arches Cluster, which is currently the densest known cluster of stars in our galaxy, astronomers have confirmed that no stars in that cluster exceed about 150 .

Rare ultramassive stars that exceed this limit – for example in the R136 star cluster – might be explained by the following proposal: Some of the pairs of massive stars in close orbit in young, unstable multiple-star systems must occasionally collide and merge where certain unusual circumstances hold that make a collision possible.

Eddington mass limit

Eddington's limit on stellar mass arises because of light-pressure: For a sufficiently massive star the outward pressure of radiant energy generated by nuclear fusion in the star's core exceeds the inward pull of its own gravity. The lowest mass for which this effect is active is the Eddington limit.

Stars of greater mass have a higher rate of core energy generation, and heavier stars' luminosities increase far out of proportion to the increase in their masses. The Eddington limit is the point beyond which a star ought to push itself apart, or at least shed enough mass to reduce its internal energy generation to a lower, maintainable rate. The actual limit-point mass depends on how opaque the gas in the star is, and metal-rich Population I stars have lower mass limits than metal-poor Population II stars. Before their demise, the hypothetical metal-free Population III stars would have had the highest allowed mass, somewhere around 300 .

In theory, a more massive star could not hold itself together because of the mass loss resulting from the outflow of stellar material. In practice the theoretical Eddington Limit must be modified for high luminosity stars and the empirical Humphreys–Davidson limit is used instead.

List of the most massive stars

The following two lists show a few of the known stars, including the stars in open cluster, OB association and H II region. Despite their high luminosity, many of them are nevertheless too distant to be observed with the naked eye. Stars that are at least sometimes visible to the unaided eye have their apparent magnitude (6.5 or brighter) highlighted in blue.

The first list gives stars that are estimated to be 60  or larger; the majority of which are shown. The second list includes some notable stars which are below 60  for the purpose of comparison. The method used to determine each star's mass is included to give an idea of the data's uncertainty; note that the mass of binary stars can be determined far more accurately. The masses listed below are the stars' current (evolved) mass, not their initial (formation) mass.

A few notable stars of mass less than 60 M☉ are included for the purpose of comparison.

Black holes

Black holes are the end point evolution of massive stars. Technically they are not stars, as they no longer generate heat and light via nuclear fusion in their cores. Some black holes may have cosmological origins, and would then never have been stars. This is thought to be especially likely in the cases of the most massive black holes.
 Stellar black holes are objects with approximately 4–15 .
 Intermediate-mass black holes range from 100 to 10 000 .
 Supermassive black holes are in the range of millions or billions .

See also

References

External links
 
 
 
 
 

Massive
Stars, most massive
Massive stars
Heaviest or most massive things